Brian Patrick Kavanagh (born January 18, 1967) is an American politician who represents the 27th district in the New York State Senate, representing Lower Manhattan and the western part of Brooklyn since December 2017. He previously served in the New York State Assembly representing the East Side of Manhattan. Kavanagh is a Democrat.

Life and career
Kavanagh is a lifelong resident of New York City. He was born and raised on Staten Island and graduated from Regis High School in Manhattan. Brian tutored students at the Lower East Side Nativity Mission Center. He graduated with an B.A. in politics from Princeton University in 1989. He then received a Juris Doctor from New York University School of Law. He worked as an attorney at the New York law firms Kaye Scholer and Schulte Roth & Zabel.

While living in Manhattan, Kavanagh lived in many different neighborhoods:  the Lower East Side, Murray Hill, NoMad, and Turtle Bay.

He was an aide to former New York City Mayors Ed Koch and David Dinkins. He served as chief of staff to New York City Council member Gale Brewer.

Kavanagh began government service as an aide to Mayor Ed Koch and has served in three mayoral administrations. After the Happy Land Social Club fire claimed the lives of 87 people in 1990, Kavanagh helped coordinate the city's response to the tragedy on behalf of Mayor David Dinkins, co-designing a task force that shut down the most grievous fire code offenders. At the Mayor's Office, Brian also played a key role in launching the New York City Department of Homeless Services and he then served as the agency's first Policy Director.

As Chief-of-Staff for then-New York City Council member Gale Brewer, Kavanagh negotiated enactment of the Domestic Worker Protection Act, promoting the rights of housekeepers and caregivers. With then-Councilmember Bill Perkins, Councilmember Brewer, and dozens of their colleagues on the Council, Kavanagh helped to draft and secure passage of Council Resolution 549, opposing the imminent invasion of Iraq.

Kavanagh has served as a counselor, volunteer, and board member at the Lower East Side's Nativity Middle School and community center, and as a board member of the Jesuit Volunteer Corps. He is a member of the New York City Bar Association and has served on the Association's Election Law Committee.

Following an unsuccessful bid for the New York City Council in 2005, Kavanagh was first elected to the New York State Assembly in November 2006. He is a member of the Democratic Party and has been endorsed by the Working Families Party. Kavanagh is the co-chair of the New York chapter of State Legislators Against Illegal Guns. He is also the Chair of the New York State Caucus of Environmental Legislators, a non-partisan coalition of over 30 members of the NYS legislature.

Kavanagh has been awarded the League of Conservation Voters Eco-Star Award, the highest rating of any legislator in 2010 from Environmental Advocates of New York, the Baruch College Legislator of the Year Award, and a perfect rating from the League of Humane Voters.

New York State Senate
In 2017, Kavanagh announced that he would run in the special election to succeed Senator Daniel Squadron, who was resigning to found a non-profit. Not without criticism, Kavanagh was nominated as the Democratic candidate, despite representing very little of the same territory in the state Assembly that the Senate district encompassed. Despite this, Kavanagh easily won election. He was easily re-elected to a full first term in 2018.

Kavanagh has been a proponent of election reform. Stating New Yorkers "have some of the worst election laws in the country," Kavanagh introduced a bill "that would allow voters to cast ballots before Election Day". Until New York enacted early voting in 2019, it was the largest state with no advance voting regime.

With Democrats taking the majority in the Senate in 2019, Kavanagh was named Chair of the Committee on Housing, Construction and Community Development.

He was reelected in 2020 and won the Democratic primary in 2022.

Election results
 September 2006 Democratic primary election, NYS Assembly, 74th AD
{| class="Wikitable"
| Brian P. Kavanagh || ... || 5,213
|-
| Sylvia M. Friedman || ... || 4,857
|-
| Esther Yang || ... || 1,022
|-
| Juan Pagan || ... || 807
|}

 November 2006 general election, NYS Assembly, 74th AD
{| class="Wikitable"
| Brian P. Kavanagh (DEM) || ... || 21,875
|-
| Sylvia M. Friedman (WOR) || ... || 3,855
|-
| Frank J. Scala (REP) || ... || 3,576
|}

 November 2008 general election, NYS Assembly, 74th AD
{| class="Wikitable"
| Brian P. Kavanagh (DEM - WOR) || ... || 38,777
|-
| Bryan A. Cooper (REP) || ... || 6,684
|}

 November 2010 general election, NYS Assembly, 74th AD
{| class="Wikitable"
| Brian P. Kavanagh (DEM - WOR) || ... || 23,071
|-
| Dena Winokur (REP) || ... || 4,332
|}
 September 2012 Democratic primary election, NYS Assembly, 74th AD
{| class="Wikitable"
| Brian P. Kavanagh || ... || 3,286
|-
| Juan Pagan || ... || 1,223
|}
 November 2012 general election, NYS Assembly, 74th AD
{| class="Wikitable"
| Brian P. Kavanagh (DEM - WOR) || ... || 34,736
|-
|}
 November 2014 general election, NYS Assembly, 74th AD
{| class="Wikitable"
| Brian P. Kavanagh (DEM - WOR) || ... || 15,588
|-
| Bryan A. Cooper (REP) || ... || 2,738
|}
 November 2016 general election, NYS Assembly, 74th AD
{| class="Wikitable"
| Brian P. Kavanagh (DEM - WOR) || ... || 81.68% (35,648 votes)
|-
| Frank Scala (REP) || ... ||15.04% (6,562 votes)
|-
| Scott Andrew Hutchins (GRE) || ... ||3.28% (1,432 votes)
|}
 November 2017 special election, NYS Senate, 26th SD
{| class="Wikitable"
| Brian P. Kavanagh (DEM - WOR) || ... || 34,674 (85.04%)
|-
| Analicia Alexander (REP) || ... ||5,915 (14.51%)
|}

Personal life
Kavanagh is one of six children of an Irish-immigrant police officer and a community leader in Staten Island who worked at a local newspaper. Kavanagh currently lives in his district in the East Side of Manhattan.

See also
 List of members of the New York State Assembly

References

Further reading
Paterson, David "Black, Blind, & In Charge: A Story of Visionary Leadership and Overcoming Adversity." New York, New York, 2020

External links
 New York State Senate: Brian Kavanagh
 Vote Smart: Senator Brian P. Kavanagh (NY)

|-

1967 births
Living people
Regis High School (New York City) alumni
Democratic Party members of the New York State Assembly
Democratic Party New York (state) state senators
New York University School of Law alumni
Princeton University alumni
21st-century American politicians
Kaye Scholer